Caulophryne pelagica is a species of fanfin, a type of anglerfish.

References

Caulophrynidae
Deep sea fish
Fish described in 1902
Taxa named by August Brauer